The Health Protection (Coronavirus, Restrictions) (Steps) (England) Regulations 2021 (SI 2021/364) is an English emergency statutory instrument which replaced The Health Protection (Coronavirus, Restrictions) (All Tiers) (England) Regulations 2020 from 29 March 2021. Initially, all of England was subject to Step 1 restrictions. Step 2 applied from 12 April 2021 and Step 3 from 17 May 2021. The regulations were originally set to expire on 30 June 2021, but that was later extended to the end of 18 July 2021. They were revoked on the latter date.

Context and earlier regulations 
A stepped approach to relaxation of pandemic-related restrictions in England was set out by the Cabinet Office in a document referred to as a "roadmap", published on 22 February 2021. These regulations partially enacted those intentions, and replaced almost all of the existing Health Protection (Coronavirus, Restrictions) (All Tiers) (England) Regulations 2020 which had been in force since 2 December 2020.

Legal basis
The regulations were made on 22 March 2021 by the Secretary of State for Health and Social Care, Matt Hancock, using emergency powers under the Public Health (Control of Disease) Act 1984, the stated legal basis being "the serious and imminent threat to public health which is posed by the incidence and spread of severe acute respiratory syndrome coronavirus 2 (SARS-CoV-2) in England". Hancock used section 45R of the Public Health (Control of Disease) Act 1984 to enact the regulations without prior parliamentary consideration, subject to retrospective approval by resolution of each House of Parliament within twenty-eight days. The regulations entered into force on 29 March 2021 and were revoked on 18 July 2021.

Step restrictions 
The scheme of the regulations was to define three levels of personal and business restrictions, called "Steps". Step 1 was the most restrictive and Step 3 the least. Although the regulations were drafted so that different areas of England could be at different Step levels simultaneously, in the event all areas of England were placed into the same level and were moved as a bloc from Step 1 to Step 2 to Step 3.

Step levels by date

General restrictions on gatherings
In all Step areas, gatherings were restricted by size, and unless one of the exceptions applied the only permitted gatherings were those shown in the table. Children were included in the counts, though certain exceptions – see below – allowed for larger gatherings with young children.

 See also the first two exceptions in the table below. These allowed, alternatively, any number of people from one or two households.

Exceptions to the restrictions on gatherings
Certain larger gatherings were permitted if one of the following exceptions applied. The list was exhaustive, in the sense that no other reasons could be used to justify contravening the general restrictions on gatherings. In some cases the exception applied only where it wasreasonably necessary', in other words where the purpose of the gathering could not reasonably be achieved in some other way.

Except where stated the exceptions applied to both indoor and outdoor gatherings. 

* "N/A" means that no exception was necessary since the activity was normally permitted under the general restrictions on gatherings for that particular Step.

Qualifying groups 
Some of the exceptions allowed individuals to attend a larger-than-normal gathering provided that they did so either alone or as part of a smaller 'qualifying group', the definition depending on the Step as in the table below. During the gathering, the person could not move between qualifying groups, nor mingle with anyone outside their group.

Linked households 
The concept of "linked households" (referred to in government statements as "support bubbles") was brought forward from previous regulations. Two households that were linked under these regulations could generally meet as if they were one household.  First and second households could link if all the adults in both households agreed. The first household had to comprise:

 A single adult
 Any number of children and no adults
 One adult and any number of children who were under the age of 18 on 12 June 2020
 Any number of adults and a child who was under the age of one on 2 December 2020
 Any number of adults and a child with a disability that required continuous care, and who was under the age of five on 2 December 2020
 One or more persons with a disability that required continuous care, on their own or together with any number of individuals who did not have such a disability (but only one of the non-disabled individuals could be aged 18 or over on 12 June 2020).

There were no limits on the second household, which could include any number of adults and children.

A household could be linked with only one other household at a time. Linked households could be changed, if all agree, subject to a minimum 10 day waiting period counted from the last date on which any member of the newly linked households participated in a gathering that was allowed only by virtue of a previous household link.

Linked childcare households 
The concept of "linked childcare households" was also brought forward from previous regulations. It was separate from "linked households".

A household with at least one child aged 13 or under could link with another household who will be providing informal childcare (formal childcare, for example by a childminder, was excluded). Only one linked childcare household was permitted at any one time, and all adults in both households had to agree. Linked childcare households could be changed, if all agreed, subject to a minimum 10 day waiting period counted from the last date on which any member of the newly linked households participated in a gathering that was allowed only by virtue of a previous childcare household link.

Organising illegal large gatherings 
It was an offence punishable by a fine or a fixed penalty of £10,000 to hold (or be involved in the holding of) an unlawful gathering:

 indoors: of more than 30 people at a private dwelling, or in a vessel; or
 outdoors: of more than 50 people in a public place, at a private dwelling, or on a vessel.

The offence did not extend to someone whose only involvement was to attend; that was subject to a lesser penalty the amount of which depended on the size of the gathering and its location.

Step 1 business restrictions

Business closures 
Unless an exception applied, the following businesses had to close in Step 1 areas:

 Nightclubs, dance halls, discotheques and facilities for public dancing to music at night, sexual entertainment venues, hostess bars, shisha bars/hookah lounges.
 Public restaurants and cafes, pubs, bars, social clubs, off-licences, businesses providing food or drink prepared on the premises for immediate consumption off the premises.
 Dance and fitness studios, gyms, sports courts, swimming pools, riding arenas, indoor play areas, trampoline and inflatable parks, other indoor leisure facilities (including laser quest and escape rooms, snooker and pool halls, indoor games, recreation and entertainment venues); casinos; bingo halls; bowling alleys; amusement arcades; cinemas, theatres and concert halls; skating rinks; circuses; theme and water parks; fairgrounds and funfairs; adventure parks and activities; aquariums, zoos, and safari parks; animal attractions at farms, wildlife centres and any other place where animals were exhibited to the public as an attraction; model villages; kitchen, bathroom, tile and glazing showrooms; museums and galleries; indoor visitor attractions at attractions that were mainly outdoors; visitor attractions at film studios; certain conference centres and exhibition halls; betting shops; spas; tanning salons; hair, nail and beauty salons; barbers; massage, tattoo and piercing studios; carpet stores; vehicle showrooms (including outdoor areas); manual car washes; auction houses; markets; retail travel agents
Libraries.
Businesses that otherwise had to close could provide a click-and-collect service, and could make deliveries in response to pre-orders.

There were a variety of specific exceptions allowing closed premises to be used for alternative purposes such as essential voluntary services, voting, education, childcare and others. Libraries and community halls were also allowed to provide digital access to public services.  Community halls could in addition open for weddings, funerals, and commemorative events to celebrate the life of a person who had died.

Businesses allowed to remain open 
The following businesses were allowed to remain open:

 Food retailers, including food markets, supermarkets and convenience stores; off licences and licensed shops selling alcohol; newsagents; pharmacies and chemists; animal rescue centres and boarding facilities; building merchants and suppliers of products and tools used in building work and repairs; petrol stations; vehicle repair and MOT services; bicycle shops; taxi or vehicle hire businesses; banks; building societies; cash points; currency exchanges; post offices; funeral directors; laundrettes and dry cleaners; medical and health services; vets and pet shops; agricultural supplies shops; offices; storage and distribution facilities; some drop off/collection points; car parks; public toilets; garden centres; automatic car washes; mobility and disability shops; livestock markets; livestock and agricultural equipment auctions.

Market stalls that sold the goods of any retailer permitted to remain open were also allowed.

Restrictions on the service of food and drink 
Businesses providing food and drink for consumption on the premises had to close, but such businesses could still provide takeaway food and drink (except alcohol) or make deliveries (which could include alcohol).

Other exceptions included:

 Private and public transport services (alcohol allowed only for airline passengers)
 Care providers
 Seating areas at motorway service stations
 Hotel room service

Closure of holiday accommodation 
All types of holiday accommodation had to close, unless an exception applied. Exceptions included work, self-isolation, moving house, person unable to return home, medical appointment, and attending a funeral.

Step 2 business restrictions – differences from Step 1 
Step 2 business restrictions were the same as Step 1, apart from the following relaxations:

Business closures 
The following indoor facilities could open in Step 2: dance and fitness studio; gyms; sports courts; swimming pools; riding arenas; indoor play areas; trampoline and inflatable parks; drive-in cinemas, theatres and circuses; outdoor skating rinks; betting shops; spas; tanning salons; hair, nail and beauty salons; barbers; massage, tattoo and piercing studios; carpet stores; vehicle showrooms; car washes; auction houses; markets; retail travel agents; libraries.

Also, outdoor-only attractions at these places could open: theme and water parks; fairgrounds and funfairs; adventure parks and activities; aquariums, zoos, and safari parks; animal attractions at farms, wildlife centres and any other place where animals were exhibited to the public as an attraction; gardens; heritage sites; museums and galleries; sculpture parks; landmarks; model villages; and visitor attractions at film studios.

All businesses providing food or drink prepared on the premises for immediate consumption off the premises could open (in Step 1 they could open only if a supermarket, convenience store, newsagent, pharmacist/chemist or a petrol station).

Restrictions on the service of food and drink 
Businesses providing food and drink for consumption on the premises could do so only in an outdoor area. Indoor areas had to remain closed, apart from toilets, baby changing rooms and breastfeeding rooms. All food and drink had to be consumed while the customer remains seated outdoors, although customers were allowed to go inside to order or to pay (although alcohol had to be ordered as well as served and consumed while the customer is seated outside).

Closure of holiday accommodation 
Some holiday accommodation could open in Step 2, specifically:

 accommodation in separate and entirely self-contained premises that were occupied by members of a single household or two linked households, and
 campsites and caravan parks, so long as the only shared facilities were the reception area, washing and clothes laundering, breastfeeding and baby changing, toilets, water, waste disposal, and facilities provided by businesses that were permitted to open.

Step 3 business restrictions

Business closures 
All businesses, including holiday accommodation, were allowed to re-open in Step 3, apart from the following: nightclubs, dance halls, discotheques and facilities for public dancing to music at night, sexual entertainment venues, hostess bars, shisha bars/hookah lounges.

Restrictions on the service of food and drink 
Special rules applied to restaurants, cafes, pubs, bars, social clubs and casinos. Where food and drink were sold for consumption on the premises, the business had to take reasonable steps to ensure that all customers remain seated while consuming. There is an additional restriction if the venue sells alcohol: customers cannot place or collect orders at the bar or serving area; all orders had to be placed and served to seated customers.

There were a variety of exceptions for motorway service areas, ports, airports and international rail terminals. The rules regarding alcohol were relaxed at cinemas, theatres, concert halls and sportsgrounds where food and drink were ordered by ticket-holders.

Collection of contact details on entry to venues 
Since September 2020, establishments where people came into prolonged contact with those from other households were required to collect and keep for 21 days records of the names and phone numbers of staff, customers, and visitors. These regulations required everyone entering as a member of a group to provide their name and contact details; previously it was sufficient for the group's leader to provide their own name and details.

Reviews and expiry 
The Secretary of State had to review the need for the restrictions every 35 days. The regulations were originally set to expire on 30 June 2021, but that was later extended to the end of 18 July 2021. The restrictions were repealed by The Health Protection (Coronavirus, Restrictions) (Steps etc.) (England) (Revocation and Amendment) Regulations 2021 with effect from 11.55pm on 18 July 2021.

Enforcement 
Breaches of the regulations were offences and could be prosecuted or dealt with by fixed penalty notices with penalties ranging between £100 and £10,000.

Restrictions on leaving the United Kingdom [repealed 17 May 2021] 
The regulations in this section were in force between 29 March and 16 May 2021 only.

For the first time, the regulations explicitly attempted to prevent individuals from leaving the United Kingdom, and these applied throughout England regardless of Step area. Exceptions applied to individuals who had 'reasonable excuse' to do so, or to whom a specific exemption applied. Unless exempt or travelling with reasonable excuse, no person was allowed to

 leave England to travel to a destination outside the UK, or
 travel to or be present at an embarkation point (such as an international terminal) in order to leave the UK

The wording of the first bullet point prevented an individual in England from, say, driving to Scotland and attempting to leave the UK from there. The wording of the second applied to anyone who was en route to an international terminal, as well as to anyone already there.

Reasonable excuses 
There was no exhaustive definition of 'reasonable excuse' in the regulations, but the following were specifically permitted.

Exempt individuals 
There was a long list of exemptions from the restrictions on leaving the UK, including certain road hauliers, seamen, aircraft crew, government contractors, technical specialists, channel tunnel workers, diplomats, consular officials, foreign government officials, representatives of international organisations, transit passengers, and persons being removed from the country.

Travel declaration form 
Apart from children and exempt individuals, anyone travelling within England on their way to leaving the United Kingdom had to carry with them a completed travel declaration form. On the form, the traveller was required to give a variety of personal details, to state the reason for leaving the UK, and to certify that the information provided was true. Anyone failing to do so who was already at an embarkation point could be required to leave without departing from the UK. Failure to comply could result in a £5000 penalty.

Summary of main changes, by date 
This chronological table lists the main changes to the Steps regulations.

References

Bibliography

External links
 Coronavirus restrictions: what you can and cannot do – Cabinet Office guidance, updated 15 June 2021
 Guidance: Restrictions on businesses and venues in England – Cabinet Office, updated 17 May 2021

Statutory Instruments of the United Kingdom
2021 in England
COVID-19 pandemic in England
Public health in the United Kingdom
2021 in British law
Law associated with the COVID-19 pandemic in the United Kingdom